Setodocus albopunctatus is a species of beetle in the family Cerambycidae, and the only species in the genus Setodocus. It was described by Stephan von Breuning in 1968.

References

Theocridini
Beetles described in 1968